Maudling is a surname. Notable people with the surname include:

Jonny Maudling, English composer, keyboard player, and drummer
Reginald Maudling (1917–1979), British Conservative Party politician

See also
Maudlin (disambiguation)